Luis Resto may refer to:
Luis Resto (boxer) (born 1955), Puerto Rican former welterweight boxer
Luis Resto (musician) (born 1961), Detroit-based musician, producer and keyboardist